Bondi Cigars is an Australian Blues and Roots band. Their album Down in the Valley was nominated for a 2002 ARIA Award for Best Blues & Roots Album.

Bondi Cigars were formed in Sydney in 1989 by Shane Pacey, Alan Britton, Les Karski and Ace Follington. Over time only Pacey and Britton remain from the original lineup. Many members have come and gone before settling on the current lineup.

Band members
 Shane Pacey – Guitar, Vocals
 Alan Britton – Bass, Vocals
 Eben Hale – Guitar, Vocals
 Frank Corby – Drums, Percussion, Vocals

Previous members
 Joel Sutton - Drums
 Andrew Vainauskas – Drums
 Mitch Grainger – Guitar, Harmonica, Vocals
 Declan Kelly – Drums, Vocals
 Clayton Doley – Hammond Organ, Piano, Vocals
 Matt Morrison – Drums, Vocals
 Les Karski – Guitar, Vocals
 Ace Follington – Drums

Discography

Albums

Awards and nominations

ARIA Music Awards
The ARIA Music Awards is an annual awards ceremony that recognises excellence, innovation, and achievement across all genres of Australian music. 

|-
| ARIA Music Awards of 2002
| Down in the Valley
| ARIA Award for Best Blues and Roots Album
| 
|-

References

External links
Bondi Cigars

Australian blues musical groups
Musical groups established in 1989
Musical groups from Sydney